The coastline of the United Kingdom is formed by a variety of natural features including islands, bays, headlands and peninsulas. It consists of the coastline of the island of Great Britain and the north-east coast of the island of Ireland, as well as many much smaller islands. Much of the coastline is accessible and quite varied in geography and habitats. Large stretches have been designated areas of natural beauty, notably the Jurassic Coast and various stretches referred to as heritage coast. They are both very long, spreading through the mainland.

Characteristics

Length
The measurement of any coastline depends upon the scale of map used and the accuracy of the measurement. A larger map scale and smaller unit of measure will result in more detail being revealed and measured and thus a greater length. And because the resultant length increases exponentially faster than the increase of scale of measurement, there is no such thing as "an approximate answer" to this question. This is referred to as the coastline paradox. A coastline is fractal-like — a fractal has self-similar properties, similar at every scale — therefore the closer the observer looks, the more detail is revealed, leading to a greater overall length.

According to the CIA Factbook, the length of the UK coastline is around 12,429 km or 7,723 miles. According to the World Resources Institute, the length is around 19,717 km.

Shape
The United Kingdom's coastline is more broken than coastlines of many other countries. It has a fractal or Hausdorff dimension or 'wiggliness' of 1.25, which is comparatively high; the Australian coastline for example has a fractal dimension of 1.13, and that of South Africa is 1.02.

As a result of this shape and the number of islands, the coastline of the UK is longer than that of similar sized countries. This means the UK has a relatively high coast/area ratio.

It is estimated that around 3 million people (out of 60 million) live on the coast of the UK. The place furthest from the coast is Coton in the Elms in Derbyshire, which is equidistant from Fosdyke Wash in Lincolnshire; White Sands between Neston in Cheshire and Flint, Flintshire in Wales; and Westbury-on-Severn Gloucestershire.

Features

Islands

There are over 1,000 islands within the UK; about 130 are permanently inhabited according to the 2001 Census. Of the remaining islands, some are used for farming and are occupied occasionally, some are nature reserves with restricted access and some are little more than sea-swept rocks. The main occupied islands and island groups in the UK are as follows:

The Channel Islands (including Jersey, Guernsey, Alderney and Sark) and the Isle of Man are not part of the UK; they are self-governing Crown dependencies therefore their coastlines are not coastlines of the United Kingdom.

Peninsulas
Peninsulas around the UK coast include:

Bays
Bays, sea lochs (loughs) and large estuaries include:

See also 
 Coastline of the North Sea
 Coastline of Wales
 Geography of the United Kingdom
 Geography of England § Coastline
 Geography of Scotland § Coastline
 Geography of Wales § Coastline
 Geography of Ireland § Coastline
 Land's End to John o' Groats
 List of headlands of the United Kingdom
 List of spits of the United Kingdom

References

External links 

 Ordnance Survey
 BBC Coast programme
 UK coast guide
 UK beach guide